The 1987 Arab Athletics Championships was the fifth edition of the international athletics competition between Arab countries. It took place in Algiers, Algeria from 6–9 July. A total of 40 athletics events were contested, 24 for men and 16 for women. The men's 20 kilometres walk was restored to the programme, having been removed after 1981. A men's 50 kilometres walk was also held for the first time.

Medal summary

Men

Women

Medal table

Overall

Men

Women

References

Results
 Al Batal Al Arabi (N°:22). Arab Athletics Union. Retrieved on 2015-02-14.

Arab Athletics Championships
Sport in Algiers
Arab Athletics Championships
Arab Athletics Championships
Arab Athletics Championships, 1987
Arab Athletics Championships, 1987
Arab Athletics Championships